The Pentagon Wars is a 1998 HBO military comedy film directed by Richard Benjamin and based on the book The Pentagon Wars: Reformers Challenge the Old Guard by Colonel James G. Burton, United States Air Force, about the development of the Bradley Fighting Vehicle.

Plot
Major General Partridge (Kelsey Grammer) is in charge of the Bradley Fighting Vehicle project, which has been in development for seventeen years at a cost of $14 billion. In an effort to curtail excessive spending by The Pentagon, Congress appoints an outsider, U.S. Air Force Lieutenant Colonel James Burton (Cary Elwes) to observe the testing of several new weapons in development, including the Bradley.

Burton quickly becomes disillusioned by the atmosphere of corruption and inefficiency at the Pentagon. He delves into the mountains of paper documenting the Bradley's development history and comes to the conclusion that it is "a troop transport that can't carry troops, a reconnaissance vehicle that's too conspicuous to do reconnaissance, and a quasi-tank that has less armor than a snowblower, but has enough ammo to take out half of D.C."

Burton's attempts to test the Bradley under combat conditions are obstructed by Partridge and his two cronies, Colonel Bock (John C. McGinley) and Major Sayers (Tom Wright). But then Burton is contacted by Brigadier General Robert L. Smith (Richard Schiff), the frustrated officer previously in charge of the vehicle's development program, who feeds him evidence on condition of anonymity.

Burton confronts Master Sergeant Dalton (Clifton Powell), in charge of the testing range, who admits being ordered to manipulate the test results, but bitterly tells Colonel Burton that every officer who tries to conduct honest tests eventually buckles under the pressure to gain his next promotion.

When Burton refuses to approve the Bradley without a live-fire test, insisting that the current version of the vehicle is a death trap, he loses his position and is ordered to Alaska. But an anonymous leak from General Smith leads to Defense Secretary Weinberger demanding a full written report on the Bradley.  Partridge, ignorant of the Bradley overall, cancels Burton's transfer and orders him to write his report, then has the report extensively rewritten by his own aide. Following the Army rule book, Burton then sends a memorandum referencing the original report to everyone who is technically involved in the project. This information leaks to the press and the resulting scandal leads to a hearing before the House Armed Services Committee.

The hearing is humiliating to Partridge, who attempts to duck simple questions by pretending to search for documentation (which his helpful aide provides to him in front of the Committee, to his further humiliation).  The skeptical Committee Chairwoman (Olympia Dukakis) goes on to order the test that Burton has requested.

The night before, Burton visits the barracks on the range and tells Dalton and his men that, regardless of whatever orders they have received from Partridge, it is their duty to their fellow soldiers to make sure the test is performed honestly. 
 
On the day of the live-fire test, Partridge, Bock, and Sayers fully expect to confirm their story that the vehicle is perfectly safe, but are unaware that Dalton and his men have actually made sure the Bradley is fully armed and fueled. When hit by an anti-tank missile, the vehicle explodes spectacularly, showering the horrified audience, including the House Committee members, with debris. Afterwards, Dalton and his men confide to Burton that they had already become convinced of his sincerity and were with him ever since.

A postscript explains that the Bradley was extensively redesigned in response to Burton's demands, which significantly reduced casualties from its use during the Persian Gulf War. However, the system was too strong: Partridge and his cronies earned their promotions and lucrative private sector jobs, while Colonel Burton was forced to retire.

Cast
Kelsey Grammer as General Partridge
Cary Elwes as Lt. Colonel William Burton
Viola Davis as Sergeant Fanning
John C. McGinley as Colonel J.D. Bock
Tom Wright as Major William Sayers
Clifton Powell as Sergeant Benjamin Dalton
Dewey Weber as Spec-4 Granger
Richard Schiff as Colonel Smith
J.C. MacKenzie as Jones
Richard Benjamin as Caspar Weinberger
Olympia Dukakis as Madam Chairwoman
Sam Anderson as Congressman
Randy Oglesby as Test Range General
Dann Florek as Major General Bob Braden
Beau Billingslea as General Rainero
Richard Riehle as General Vice
Chris Ellis as General Keane
Drew Snyder as Admiral Morehouse
Bruce French as General De Grasso
Tim DeKay as Junior Officer Embassy Party

Production
Col. James Burton is credited as a consultant on the film. 
Russell Murray II is also credited as a consultant on the film. Mr. Murray served as Principal Deputy Assistant Secretary of Defense for Systems Analysis from 1962-1969 and Assistant Secretary of Defense for Program Analysis and Evaluation 1977-1981, both during the development of the Bradley Fighting Vehicle.

Writer Martyn Burke also wrote the 1999 film version of Animal Farm, also starring Kelsey Grammer.

HBO rated the film TV-MA-L upon release.  The MPAA rated the film "R for Language."

Filming 
The Pentagon Wars was filmed in Camp Roberts, CA.

Reception
On review aggregator website Rotten Tomatoes, the film holds an approval rating of 86%, and an average rating of 3.9/5.

Upon its premiere on HBO, Daryl Miller reviewed the film for the Los Angeles Times and described it as "a savvy satire of military spending--an epic tale of boys and their toys...a triumph for that cable outlet."

Awards 
 Primetime Emmy Awards 1998: Amy Stofsky (costume supervisor) - Winner of Outstanding Costuming for a Miniseries, Movie or a Special 
 Columbus International Film & Video Festival 1998: Winner of Chris Award for Social Issues
 Satellite Awards Cary Elwes - Nominee Golden Satellite Award for Best Actor in a Miniseries or a Motion Picture Made for Television

See also 
Col James Burton and the Joint Live Fire Testing Program - Section of article on Bradley Fighting Vehicle

References

 James G. Burton, The Pentagon Wars: Reformers Challenge the Old Guard (Annapolis, MD: Naval Institute Press, 1993),

External links
 
 Tim Weiner's review of the James Burton's Book, "Corrupt From Top to Bottom", New York Times

1998 television films
1998 films
1998 comedy films
American comedy television films
Films based on non-fiction books
Films about the United States Army
Films about American military personnel
Films about bureaucracy
Military humor in film
Films directed by Richard Benjamin
Films with screenplays by Martyn Burke
HBO Films films
FMC Corporation
Films set in Washington, D.C.
Films set in the 1980s
1990s American films